Furnese is a surname. Notable people with the surname include:

Furnese baronets
Henry Furnese (disambiguation), multiple people
Robert Furnese (1687–1733), English politician